The discography of Måns Zelmerlöw, a Swedish pop singer and television presenter. His debut studio album, Stand by For..., was released in March 2007. It peaked at number 1 on the Swedish Albums Chart. In November 2006, it was announced that Zelmerlöw would compete in Melodifestivalen 2007, Sweden's national final for the Eurovision Song Contest 2007, to be held in Helsinki, Finland. He competed with the song "Cara Mia" in the 3rd semi-final on 17 February 2007 in Örnsköldsvik, and progressed to the final, which was held on 10 March at Globen in Stockholm. There his performance of "Cara Mia" finished in third place behind winners The Ark and runner-up Andreas Johnson. Four singles were released from the album; "Cara Mia", "Work of Art (Da Vinci)", "Brother Oh Brother" and "Miss America", all of which reached the Top 50 in on the Swedish Singles Chart.

MZW, Zelmerlöw's second studio album, was released in March 2009. The album peaked at number 1 on the Swedish Albums Chart. On 18 November 2008, it was announced that he would once again compete in Melodifestivalen, this time with the song "Hope & Glory". Zelmerlöw took part in the second semi-final on 14 February 2009 and once again progressed to the final on 14 March at Globen. "Hope & Glory" ultimately placed fourth despite receiving the most votes from the jury. Four singles were released from the album; "Impossible", "Hope & Glory" and "Hold On" reached the Top 50 in on the Swedish Singles Chart. "Rewind" was released as the fourth single from the album in Poland.

Christmas with Friends, Zelmerlöw's third studio album, was released in November 2010. Kära vinter, Zelmerlöw's fourth studio album, was released in December 2011. Both albums include the singles "December" and "Vit som en snö" with Pernilla Andersson. Barcelona Sessions, Zelmerlöw's fifth studio album, was released in February 2014. The album peaked at number 3 on the Swedish Albums Chart and includes the singles "Broken Parts", "Beautiful Life" and "Run for Your Life".

Perfectly Damaged, Zelmerlöw's sixth studio album, was released in June 2015. It peaked at number 1 on the Swedish Albums Chart. In 2015 it was announced that Zelmerlöw would compete in Melodifestivalen 2015, Sweden's national final for the Eurovision Song Contest 2015. He competed with the song "Heroes" in the 4th semi-final on 28 February 2015 in Örebro, and progressed to the final, which was held on 14 March 2015 at the Friends Arena in Stockholm. There his performance of "Heroes" finished first and represented Sweden at the Eurovision Song Contest 2015, held at the Wiener Stadthalle in Vienna, Austria. He performed during the 2nd Semi-final on 21 May 2015 for a place in the Final. The song progressed to the Final which took place on 23 May 2015. The song went on to win the contest with 365 points. "Should've Gone Home" was released as the second single from the album. The song peaked at number 27 on the Swedish Singles Chart. "Fire in the Rain" was released as the lead single from the re-issued version of the album titled Perfectly Re:Damaged. The song peaked at number 31 on the Swedish Singles Chart.

Chameleon, Zelmerlöw's seventh studio album, was released in December 2016. It peaked at number 6 on the Swedish Albums Chart. "Fire in the Rain" was included as the lead single from the album. "Hanging on to Nothing" was released as the second single from the album on 26 August 2016. The song did not enter the Swedish Singles Chart, but peaked at number 2 on the Sweden Heatseeker Songs. "Glorious" was released as the third single from the album on 24 November 2016. The song did not enter the Swedish Singles Chart, but peaked at number 17 on the Sweden Heatseeker Songs. Time, Zelmerlöw's eighth studio album, was released in October 2019. It peaked at number 18 on the Swedish Albums Chart. The album includes the singles "Walk with Me", "Better Now", "One", "On My Way" and "Mirror".

Albums

Studio albums

Singles

As lead artist

As featured artist

Promotional singles

Music videos

Notes

References

External links
 

Discographies of Swedish artists